Annie Isabella Cameron (1897-1973) was a Scottish historian.

Biography
She was the daughter of Mary Sinclair, and James Cameron, a Glasgow engineer. She studied history at the University of Glasgow and the University of St Andrews. She wrote a doctoral thesis on Bishop Kennedy of St Andrews.

She worked at the Scottish Record Office and in 1938 married George Dunlop, proprietor of the Kilmarnock Standard.

She died in 1973.

Marcus Merriman, a historian of the Rough Wooing acknowledged Annie Cameron, Marguerite Wood, and Gladys Dickinson for their work publishing 16th-century primary sources. He praised Cameron for her "stunning" edition of the Scottish correspondence of Mary of Guise, "placing in the hands of the researcher something formidably useful."

Selected publications
 Annie I. Cameron, Scottish Correspondence of Mary of Lorraine (SHS: Edinburgh, 1927)
 Robert S. Rait & Annie I. Cameron, King James's Secret: Negotiations between Elizabeth and James VI relating to the Execution of Mary Queen of Scots, from the Warrender Papers (London, 1927)
 Annie I. Cameron, Warrender Papers, 2 vols (Edinburgh, 1931)
 Annie I. Cameron, Calendar State Papers Scotland: 1593-1595, vol. 11 (Edinburgh, 1936)
 Annie Dunlop, The Life and Times of James Kennedy, Bishop of St Andrews (St Andrews, 1950).
 Annie Dunlop, The Royal Burgh of Ayr (Edinburgh: Oliver and Boyd, 1953).

References

1897 births
1973 deaths
20th-century Scottish women writers
20th-century Scottish historians
Historians of Scotland